The Europe/Africa Zone was one of the three zones of the regional Davis Cup competition in 1990.

In the Europe/Africa Zone there were two different tiers, called groups, in which teams competed against each other to advance to the upper tier.

Group I

Winners in Group I advanced to the World Group Qualifying Round, along with losing teams from the World Group first round. Teams who lost in the first round competed in the relegation play-offs, with winning teams remaining in Group I, whereas teams who lost their play-offs were relegated to the Europe/Africa Zone Group IIs in 1991.

Participating nations

Draw

  and  relegated to Group II in 1991.

Group II Europe

The winner in the Europe Zone Group II advanced to the Europe/Africa Zone Group I in 1991.

Participating nations

Draw

  promoted to Group I in 1991.

Group II Africa

The winner in the Africa Zone Group II advanced to the Europe/Africa Zone Group I in 1991.

Participating nations

Draw

  promoted to Group I in 1991.

External links
Davis Cup official website

Davis Cup Europe/Africa Zone
Europe Africa Zone